A statue of Franz Kafka by artist Jaroslav Róna was installed on Vězeňská street in the Jewish Quarter of Prague, Czech Republic in December 2003. It is situated near the Spanish Synagogue. It depicts Franz Kafka riding on the shoulders of a headless figure, in reference to the author's 1912 story "Description of a Struggle" (Beschreibung eines Kampfes).

See also

 2003 in art

References

External links
 

2003 establishments in the Czech Republic
2003 sculptures
Cultural depictions of Franz Kafka
Monuments and memorials in Prague
Old Town (Prague)
Outdoor sculptures in Prague
Sculptures of men in Prague
Statues in Prague
Kafka
Works about Franz Kafka
Josefov (Prague)
21st-century architecture in the Czech Republic